Bob Casey Jr. (born 1960) is a U.S. Senator from Pennsylvania since 2007. Senator Casey may also refer to:

Bob Casey Sr. (1932–2000), Pennsylvania State Senate
Jack Casey (born 1935), New Jersey Senate
Lyman R. Casey (1837–1914), U.S. Senator from North Dakota from 1889 to 1893
Michael E. Casey (1870–1949), Missouri State Senate
Samuel K. Casey (1818–1871), Illinois State Senate
Thomas S. Casey (1832–1891), Illinois State Senate
Zadok Casey (1796–1862), Illinois State Senate